Simon Forbes Newbold Hobday (23 June 1940 – 2 March 2017) was a South African professional golfer who won tournaments on three continents.

Amateur career 
Hobday was born in Mafikeng. He lived part of his life in Zambia and represented the country in the 1966 Eisenhower Trophy. In early 1969 he was still was an amateur golfer and still represented Zambia. At the time, he worked as a car salesman in Lusaka, the capital of Zambia.

In April 1969, while still an amateur, Hobday played the Kenya Open. In the final round he broke the course record at the Muthaiga Golf Course with a 66 (−6) to leap into second place. At 284 (−4) he finished joint runner-up with Scotland's Bernard Gallacher, five behind champion Maurice Bembridge. He defeated several notable professionals including Christy O'Connor Snr and Australia's Bob Tuohy.

Professional career 
Hobday turned professional in 1969. He spent his regular career mainly on the Southern Africa Tour, where he won six times and the European Tour, where he won the 1976 German Open and the 1979 Madrid Open. As a senior, he played mainly in the United States on the Senior PGA Tour (now Champions Tour), where he claimed five titles between 1993 and 1995 including one senior major, the 1994 U.S. Senior Open.

Hobday also lived in Rhodesia.

Professional wins (17)

European Tour wins (2)

Sunshine Tour wins (6)
1971 South African Open
1978 Rhodesian Dunlop Masters
1978 Victoria Falls Classic
1979 Rhodesian Open
1981 ICL International
1985 Trustbank Tournament of Champions

Senior PGA Tour wins (5)

Senior PGA Tour playoff record (1–0)

Other senior wins (4)
1997/98 Vodacom Senior Classic (South Africa)
2001 Nelson Mandela Invitational (with Martin Maritz), Liberty Mutual Legends of Golf - Legendary Division (with Jim Albus)
2003 Nelson Mandela Invitational (with Lee Westwood)

Champions Tour major championships

Wins (1)

Results in major championships

Note: Hobday never played in the Masters Tournament or PGA Championship.

WD = withdrew
CUT = missed the half-way cut (3rd round cut in 1977 and 1984 Open Championships)
"T" indicates a tie for a place

Team appearances
Amateur
Eisenhower Trophy (representing Zambia): 1966

Professional
Double Diamond International (representing the Rest of the World): 1976, 1977

See also
List of African golfers

References

External links

South African male golfers
Sunshine Tour golfers
European Tour golfers
PGA Tour Champions golfers
Winners of senior major golf championships
People from Mahikeng
1940 births
2017 deaths